Niccolò Ferrari (born 24 August 1987, in Padova) is an Italian slalom canoeist who has competed at the international level since 2007.

Ferrari won a silver medal in the Mixed C2 event at the 2017 ICF Canoe Slalom World Championships in Pau together with Stefanie Horn. At the 2012 Summer Olympics he competed in the C2 event together with Pietro Camporesi. They did not advance to the semifinals after finishing 13th in the qualifying round.

Results

References

Italian male canoeists
1987 births
Living people
Olympic canoeists of Italy
Canoeists at the 2012 Summer Olympics
Sportspeople from Verona
Medalists at the ICF Canoe Slalom World Championships
21st-century Italian people